K. B. Menon was an Indian politician and independence activist from Kerala. He represented Badagara in Lok sabha between 1957 and 1962.

Early life 
He was born as son of V. Raman Menon a munsiff magistrate in the year 1897. Menon graduated from Bombay University and was appointed at Nizam college, Hyderabad. Soon, he resigned the post in order to pursue Ph.D. at University of California. Menon earned a doctorate in economics from the University of Colorado. He joined University of Harvard as professor where he met Jayaprakash Narayan who was sent to the US for higher studies, that friendship guided Menon into a new way.

Independence movement 
Menon left his job behind and returned to India. He assumed the office of general secretary of All India Civil Liberties Union founded by Jawaharlal Nehru aimed at aiding people suffering from torture for participation in National movement. Menon became a resident of Gandhi ashram when the office of citizens’ forum of the princely states was changed to Wardha in 1941 and secured friendship with Mahatma Gandhi.

Keezhariyur Bomb Case

Menon returned to Kerala as part of Quit India Movement, this arrival intensified strength of the movement in Malabar dist. and Cochin. He was main man behind the famous Keezhariyur bomb conspiracy case which attracted media attention from the whole country. He was the first accused and sentenced to ten year rigorous imprisonment. He was released after five years following independence, however those days in jail rotted his health.

After independence 
Menon was a strict follower and proponent of Gandhism as well as socialism. He left Congress as socialists departed. Nehru, a close friend and admirer of his wanted Menon by his side, but Menon asked to join the socialists instead. He was elected to Madras Legislative Assembly in 1952 from Thrithala constituency as a socialist candidate. He represented Badagara in the Loksabha following the second general election. Once again he shone in electoral politics as he was elected from Quilandy constituency in 1965, since none of the parties gained majority the assembly was dissolved. There was a move in background for creating government under Menon but he became a victim of backstage betrayals. He returned to Congress in his last days.

Death 
Dr. Menon breathed his last on 6 September 1967 at Kozhikode Medical College. He was cremated in the compound of Thrithala High School where he used to reside during his last days, the school was established as a result of his serious interventions.

Eponyms 
 Dr. K. B. Menon Memorial Higher Secondary School
 Villappally Panchayat PHC

See also 
 Mathai Manjooran
 K. Kelappan
 V. K. Krishna Menon
 K. C. S. Mani
 K. M. Panicker

References 

1897 births
1967 deaths
India MPs 1957–1962
Gandhians
Indian civil rights activists
Indian independence activists from Kerala
Indian National Congress politicians from Kerala
Lok Sabha members from Kerala
Malayali politicians
Harvard University faculty
University of California, Berkeley alumni